Or Akiva (light of Akiva–in memory of Rabbi Akiva who was tortured and killed at this locale) is a city located in the Haifa District of Israel, on the country's coastal plain. It is located just inland from the ancient port city of Caesarea and the Mediterranean Sea, and to the north of the city of Hadera. The city's logo is inscribed with a Biblical verse from Job 8:7: "Your beginnings will be humble, so prosperous will your future be."

Demographics
According to the Israel Central Bureau of Statistics (CBS), at the end of 2005 the city had a total population of 15,800, making it is the least-populous city in Israel. According to CBS, in 2001 the ethnic makeup of the city was 99.3% Jewish and other non-Arab, with no significant Arab population. There were 7,400 males and 7,900 females. The population of the city was spread out, with 33.7% 19 years of age or younger, 15.4% between 20 and 29, 20.8% between 30 and 44, 16.3% from 45 to 59, 4.1% from 60 to 64, and 9.7% 65 years of age or older. The population growth rate in 2001 was -0.1%.

Economy
Or Akiva is home to a number of large industrial plants, among them Dexxon (pharmaceuticals), Anna Lotan Ltd. (professional skin care), Darbox Ltd. (plastic packaging), Meprolight (gunsights and nightvision), Plasson (livestock feeders), STI Laser Industries Ltd. and Tyco International (electronics).

Education
According to CBS, there are 10 schools and 2,409 students in the city. They are spread out, as 6 elementary schools and 1,575 elementary school students, and 5 high schools and 834 high school students. 51.9% of 12th grade students were entitled to a matriculation certificate in 2001.

Since 2005 gap year volunteers from Habonim Dror have volunteered in the town and surrounding areas working in schools and in extracurricular frameworks with Arab and Jewish youth.

Neighborhoods in Or Akiva
The Yuval - is considered a high-quality neighborhood in Or Akiva and is located in the north of the city, bounded by the northern industrial area to the east and road number 2 (coastal road) to the west. Today, about 4,500 residents live in the neighborhood, which is about 1,700 households. The neighborhood is partly characterized by detached houses, and partly by saturated construction as well as 20-story tall buildings.

Or Gardens (גני אור)- located between the center and the south of the city of Or Akiva. It is bounded between Shidlovsky Boulevard to the north, Koplovich to the east and Hanasi Weizman Boulevard to the south and west. The construction in the neighborhood is characterized by detached construction of cottages and two-family houses. The Gani Or neighborhood is saturated in terms of construction and has no additional construction reserves.

Ben Gurion - Neve Alon - Canadian (בן גוריון, נווה אלון, קנדי)- is located in the center of the city and is bounded between Shidlovsky streets in the south, Herzl-Stanley in the north, Ha'atsmaat in the east and the beach road in the west. The construction in the neighborhood is characterized by old construction where there are eviction projects planned.

Neve Or(נווה אור) - a new neighborhood located on the eastern side of Or Akiva and which is bounded by Route 4 in the east, Shidlovsky Street in the south, in the Ben Gurion neighborhood in the west. The neighborhood is characterized by new construction.

Nof Yam (נוף ים)- a new and young neighborhood located on the west side of Or Akiva and which is bounded by Route 2 in the west, Shadilovsky Boulevard in the north and Shikimim St. in the south. The neighborhood is characterized by saturated new construction and residential towers.

Shazar (שז"ר)- an old neighborhood located north of the Ben Gurion neighborhood and bounded by Route 2 to the west and David Elazar St. to the north. There are evacuation plans for the evacuation of tower blocks and the construction of towers of about 25 stories each.

Rabin Gardens (רבין)- the neighborhood is located in the south of Or Akiva, at the western end. The neighborhood is bounded between Hanasi Weizman Boulevard and Shidlovsky Boulevard in the north, Highway 2 in the west, east of King David Boulevard in the east (Orot neighborhood), to the south the Or Yam neighborhood. The neighborhood is characterized by low construction, attached to land, two-family houses and several multi-story buildings.

Orot (אורות)- a neighborhood located on the eastern side of Or Akiva and bordered to the west by the Gani Rabin neighborhood, to the south by the Or Yam neighborhood and to the east by Highway 4, the neighborhood was built in the 1990s and is characterized by construction saturated with buildings between 4-8 as well as low-rise detached buildings.

Or Yam (אור ים)- is the new neighborhood in the settlement, part of which is inhabited and part of which is still under construction. The neighborhood is being built on the historic lands of Baron Rothschild next to Laor Akiva and will be annexed to the city. The neighborhood is located on the southern border of Or Akiva between roads 2, 4 and road no. 651, the neighborhood was designed with low density and includes employment areas, commerce, public buildings and is expected to include about 3,500 units in which about 12,000 residents are expected to live. The public institutions in the neighborhood include dormitories , kindergartens, an elementary school, a high school, sports facilities, health stations for the family, community gardens and will include two ecological lakes and indoor walking and cycling paths of about 2 km in length. The neighborhood was designed by Or Akiva Municipality and the Caesarea Development Company.

Notable people

Rafi Dahan (born 1989), footballer
Eran Levy (born 1985), footballer
Lior Refaelov (born 1986), footballer

International relations

Twin towns — sister cities
Or Akiva is twinned with:

 Miami, United States (Or Akiva has twinned with the Jewish community in Miami)
 Hîncești, Moldova

References

External links
Or Akiva Municipality  
Or Akiva civic auditorium  

Cities in Israel
Cities in Haifa District
Populated places established in 1951
1951 establishments in Israel
Rabbi Akiva